Bear River is a town in Uinta County, Wyoming, United States, incorporated in 2001. The population was 518 at the 2010 census.

Geography

Demographics

2010 census
As of the census of 2010, there were 518 people, 182 households, and 147 families residing in the town. The racial makeup of the town was 95.8% White, 0.2% African American, 0.4% Native American, 0.2% Asian, 1.4% from other races, and 2.1% from two or more races. Hispanic or Latino of any race were 5.2% of the population.

There were 182 households, of which 42.3% had children under the age of 18 living with them, 70.9% were married couples living together, 2.7% had a female householder with no husband present, 7.1% had a male householder with no wife present, and 19.2% were non-families. 14.8% of all households were made up of individuals, and 1.6% had someone living alone who was 65 years of age or older. The average household size was 2.85 and the average family size was 3.16.

The median age in the town was 38 years. 29.7% of residents were under the age of 18; 5.7% were between the ages of 18 and 24; 24% were from 25 to 44; 36% were from 45 to 64; and 4.8% were 65 years of age or older. The gender makeup of the town was 51.2% male and 48.8% female.

Education
Public education in the town of Bear River is provided by Uinta County School District #1.

See also
List of municipalities in Wyoming

References

External links
Official Website

Bear River (Great Salt Lake)
Towns in Uinta County, Wyoming
Towns in Wyoming